Barry Latzer (born 1945) is an American criminologist and emeritus professor of criminal justice at the John Jay College of Criminal Justice. He previously taught at the Graduate Center, CUNY. He also prosecuted and defended accused criminals while teaching both there and at John Jay. In 2016, his book The Rise and Fall of Violent Crime in America was published by Encounter Books. In 2021 The Roots of Violent Crime in America: From the Gilded Age through the Great Depression was published by LSU Press. In 2022 his book The Myth of Overpunishment: A Defense of the American Justice System and a Proposal to Reduce Incarceration While Protecting the Public was published by Republic Book Publishers. He is an expert on core curricula and has lectured and written extensively on capital punishment as well as state constitutional criminal procedure law.

Latzer's work outside the university included service as an Assistant District Attorney in Brooklyn (1985-1986), and as a member of the Indigent Defendants Appeals Panel in Manhattan (1987-1990). He also served (2003-2005) as a Senior Consultant for the American Council of Trustees and Alumni, a higher education reform organization, where he managed projects involving core curricula. Latzer was a member of the board of trustees of the National Association of Scholars from 2004 to 2017, and a co-founder and member of the executive committee of the CUNY Association of Scholars (1997-2003).

Barry Latzer has also appeared numerous times on TV and podcasts being interviewed and discussing his books.

Education
Latzer received his Ph.D. in political science from the University of Massachusetts, Amherst in 1977, and his J.D. from Fordham University in 1985.

Books
State Constitutions and Criminal Justice (Greenwood Press, 1991)
State Constitutional Criminal Law (Clark, Boardman, Callaghan, 1995)
Death Penalty Cases (Butterworth-Heinemann, 200)
The Rise and Fall of Violent Crime in America (Encounter Books, 2016)
The Roots of Violent Crime in America: From the Gilded Age through the Great Depression (LSU Press, 2021)
The Myth of Overpunishment: A Defense of the American Justice System and a Proposal to Reduce Incarceration While Protecting the Public. Description.  (Republic Book Publishers, 2022)

Other writing
"Don't Call Rioters 'Protesters'" (commentary) , The Wall Street Journal, June 4, 2020; for context, the WSJ lead online news headline the same day was "Protesters Gather to Memorialize George Floyd" .

References

Living people
1945 births
John Jay College of Criminal Justice faculty
University of Massachusetts Amherst College of Social and Behavioral Sciences alumni
American criminologists
Fordham University School of Law alumni
Graduate Center, CUNY faculty